Yury Mikhailovich Klimov (22 July 1940 – 17 October 2022) was a Soviet and Russian handball player who competed in the 1972 Summer Olympics and in the 1976 Summer Olympics.

Klimov was born in Ukhta on 22 July 1940. He trained in Moscow and became the Honoured Master of Sports of the USSR in 1973. Klimov played 173 matches for the USSR National Team. At the 1972 Summer Olympics he was part of the Soviet team which finished fifth. He played all six matches and scored seven goals. Four years later he won the gold medal with the Soviet team. He played all six matches and scored twelve goals. He coached from 1979, and latterly served as the coach of the Iran men's national handball team. Klimov was awarded the Order of the Red Banner of Labour in 1976.

Klimov died on 17 October 2022, at the age of 82.

Coaching career
 Iran men's national handball team (2006–08)
 Zob Ahan Esfahan (2009–20??)

References

External links
 
profile

1940 births
2022 deaths
Soviet male handball players
Russian male handball players
Handball players at the 1972 Summer Olympics
Handball players at the 1976 Summer Olympics
Honoured Masters of Sport of the USSR
Recipients of the Order of the Red Banner of Labour
Olympic handball players of the Soviet Union
Olympic gold medalists for the Soviet Union
Olympic medalists in handball
People from Ukhta
Medalists at the 1976 Summer Olympics
Sportspeople from the Komi Republic
Peter the Great St. Petersburg Polytechnic University alumni